Formula SAE Australasia (FSAE-A) is the Australian event of the US-based Formula SAE and has been running since 2000 by SAE Australasia.  Since 2018 the competition has been held at Winton Motor Raceway, Winton, Benalla, Victoria.  Due to COVID-19, the 2020 event was held online and the 2021 event was cancelled.  The 2022 event will be held at Winton Motor Raceway from 8-11 December.

See also 
 UoP Racing team

External links
 Official website

Australasia